The 1957 Kansas State Wildcats football team represented Kansas State University in the 1957 NCAA University Division football season.  The team's head football coach was Bus Mertes.  The Wildcats played their home games in Memorial Stadium.  1957 saw the Wildcats finish with a record of 3–6–1, and a 2–4 record in Big Seven Conference play.  The Wildcats scored only 124 points while giving up 166.  The finished tied for fifth in the Big Seven.

Schedule

References

Kansas State
Kansas State Wildcats football seasons
Kansas State Wildcats football